For the United States, the extremes are  in Death Valley, California in 1913 and  recorded in Prospect Creek, Alaska in 1971.

The most dramatic temperature changes occur in North American climates susceptible to Chinook winds.

Lack of extremes 

See also
U.S. state temperature extremes

External links
 Temperature extremes site at Perth Weather Centre
 Each state's high temperature record USA Today, last updated August 2006.
 Each state's low temperature record USA Today, last updated August 2006.

Climate of the United States